Roman Rostislavich (Cyrillic: Роман Ростиславич) (died 1180), Prince of Smolensk (1160–1172, 1177–1180), Grand Prince of Kiev (Kyiv, 1171–1173, 1175–1177) and Prince of Novgorod (1178–1179). He was the son of Rostislav Mstislavich.

Temporarily installed as Grand Prince of Kiev in July 1171, he was quickly replaced by Andrey Bogolyubsky's brother, Mikhail of Vladimir.

He had a son: Mstislav III of Kiev.

References

Succession

Year of birth missing
1180 deaths
Rostislavichi family (Smolensk)
Rurik dynasty
Princes of Smolensk
Princes of Novgorod
Grand Princes of Kiev
12th-century princes in Kievan Rus'
Eastern Orthodox monarchs